= Bobby Mathieson (UVF member) =

Ulster Loyalist convicted of murder

Bobby Mathieson notable for his subsequent embrace of Evangelical Christianity and art.

Sentenced to life imprisonment for his part in the murder of a Catholic civilian, an employee at a garage named John Gerald O'Neill, Mathieson survived a suicide attempt brought on by feelings of guilt. Mathieson was eighteen years old when he joined the UVF, and twenty-two at the time of his sentencing to life imprisonment. Part of Mathieson's time in jail was spent at the infamous Maze prison. Mathieson has stated that his decision to join the East Belfast section of the UVF was not motivated by hatred of Catholics and that some members of his family are Catholic. He was released in 1996. Mathieson's time in prison amounted to 14 years in total. The gang Mathieson formed a part of have been connected to ten sectarian murders. While in prison Mathieson took A-level examinations in Art and Maths, his art has been part of exhibitions relating to prison experiences.

As a young man Mathieson was signed to play for Linfield F.C.and was part of their reserve team. On leaving prison Mathieson became a successful business man. In 2021 Mathieson featured in a BBC television programme about religious faith. Now a Christian preacher, he is married to wife Alison with whom he has five children.
